The Devil's Arrows are four standing stones or menhirs in an alignment approximately  to the east of the A1(M), adjacent to Roecliffe Lane, Boroughbridge in North Yorkshire, England, near to where the A1 road now crosses the River Ure. They have been designated as a scheduled monument since 1923.

Site
William Camden mentions four stones in his Britannia, noting that "one was lately pulled downe by some that hoped, though in vaine, to finde treasure." One was apparently displaced during a failed 'treasure hunt' during the 18th century and later used as the base for a nearby bridge over a river. The stones are composed of millstone grit, the most likely source of which is Plumpton Rocks two miles south of Knaresborough, and about nine miles from where the stones stand today.

It is thought that they may have been arranged to align with the southernmost summer moonrise. The stones are part of a wider Neolithic complex on the Ure-Swale plateau which incorporates the Thornborough Henges.

Name

The name is mentioned by John Aubrey who visited and drew the stones in 1687. There is a legend, which goes back to 1721, that says the Devil threw the stones, aiming at the next town of Aldborough. He stood on Howe Hill and shouted, "Borobrigg keep out o' way, for Aldborough town I will ding down!". However, the stones fell short and landed near Boroughbridge instead.

See also
Menhir
List of menhirs

References

External links

 The Devil's Arrows at Megalithia.com
 The Devil's Arrows at The Modern Antiquarian

History of North Yorkshire
Megalithic monuments in England
Stone Age sites in England
Buildings and structures in North Yorkshire
Tourist attractions in North Yorkshire
Boroughbridge
Archaeological sites in North Yorkshire
Bronze Age sites in North Yorkshire
Scheduled monuments in North Yorkshire
Menhirs